Kriushinsky is a rural locality (a khutor) and the administrative center of Khopyoropionerskoye Rural Settlement, Uryupinsky District, Volgograd Oblast, Russia. The population was 783 as of 2010. There are 9 streets.

Geography 
Kriushinsky is located in steppe, 57 km north of Uryupinsk (the district's administrative centre) by road. Povorino is the nearest rural locality.

References 

Rural localities in Uryupinsky District